Yellow Cross (Gelbkreuz) is a World War I chemical warfare agent usually based on sulfur mustard (mustard gas, HS, Yperite, Lost).

The original Gelbkreuz was a composition of 80–90% of sulfur mustard and 10–20% of tetrachloromethane or chlorobenzene as a solvent which lowered its viscosity and acted as an antifreeze, or, alternatively, 80% sulfur mustard, 10% bis(chloromethyl) ether, and 10% tetrachloromethane. A later formulation, Gelbkreuz 1, was a mixture of 40% ethyldichloroarsine, 40% ethyldibromoarsine, and 20% of bis(chloromethyl) ether. In some cases nitrobenzene was used to mask the material's characteristic odor. French "ypérite no.20" was a similar mixture of 80% sulfur mustard and 20% tetrachloromethane.

Yellow Cross is also a generic World War I German marking for artillery shells with chemical payload affecting the skin.

See also 
 Green Cross (chemical warfare)
 Blue Cross (chemical warfare)
 White Cross (chemical warfare)

References

Blister agents
World War I chemical weapons